The 1936–37 Washington State Cougars men's basketball team represented Washington State College for the  college basketball season. Led by ninth-year head coach Jack Friel, the Cougars were members of the Pacific Coast Conference and played their home games on campus at WSC Gymnasium in Pullman, Washington.

In the three-way playoff, Washington State defeated rival Washington in Seattle, and defeated Oregon eight nights later in Pullman to win their first division title.

The best-of-three conference playoff series was held in Pullman against Southern division winner Stanford; the Cougars lost two close games.

The National Invitation Tournament (NIT) debuted the next year, and the NCAA tournament in 1939.

Postseason results

|-
!colspan=5 style=| PCC Northern Division Playoff

|-
!colspan=5 style=| Pacific Coast Conference Playoff Series

References

External links
Sports Reference – Washington State Cougars: 1936–37 basketball season

Washington State Cougars men's basketball seasons
Washington State Cougars
Washington State
Washington State